American Midwest Ballet, is a dance company in Council Bluffs, Iowa. In 2019, American Midwest Ballet was moved to downtown Council Bluffs.

Company repertoire includes an annual production of The Nutcracker featuring local student dancers. Past works included pieces from guest choreographers Paul Boos, Peter Anastos, Nilas Martins, Harrison McEldowney, Mariana Olivera, Jeff Satinoff, Edward Truitt, Frank Chaves, and Ann Reinking.

References

Non-profit organizations based in Nebraska